Sarsfields is a Gaelic Athletic Association club based in Newbridge in County Kildare, Ireland, winner of 25 Kildare Senior Football Championships. The club name is linked to Patrick Sarsfield's castle in the area and the colours, green with white sash, were based on the colours allegedly worn by Sarsfield's men. Pat "Boiler" White (grandfather of current Kildare footballer Gary White) was a member of the Kildare Gaelic football team of the millennium. Niall Buckley was an All Stars Award winner at midfield in 1997. Dermot Earley was an All Stars Award at left half forward winner in 1998 and at Mid-Field in 2009. The club has seen major success across all competitions in recent years due to the hard work and dedication of its members.

Football
Sarsfields has over a century of history behind it. In 1897, the club was founded with its headquarters in Roseberry and registered as ” Sons of Sarsfield Gaelic Football Club”. The green jersey with the Sash was the chosen club colours and has continued as such to the present day.
On the playing fields Sarsfields won its first championship within seven years, annexing the 1904 title when beating Naas in Clane, in a delayed final played in January 1905. Combining with Clane, Sarsfields under the captaincy of Jack Murray won the 1905 All Ireland as Kildare representatives.
Nine Sarsfields players played on the Kildare team that reached the All Ireland final in 1903, Jack and Mick Fitzgeralds, Jim and Mick Murray, Jack Gorman, Matt Donnelly, Jem Scott, Mick Kennedy and Frank ‘Joyce” Conlan. A nephew of the team captain Jack Murray was Mick Geraghty who featured in the emergence of the new Sarsfields club that won five titles in seven years after 1945, including a three-in-a-row 1950-2.
For the next decade Sarsfields dominated Kildare football, only a Monasterevin intervention in 1911 prevented the Sash winning nine titles in a row.
The next golden era was the 1945 – 1952 period, winning championships in 1945, 1947 and culminating in a three in a row 1950 – 1952. Remarkably, considering the quality of teams from Carbury, Raheens, Clane and indeed Sarsfields over the years no club has managed to win three in succession since that time.
Sarsfields had to wait thirty years for their next championship win when a team, including Dermot Earley, John Courtney, Ray O Sullivan and Shay Fahy (later an All Ireland winner with Cork) and John Crofton defeated St. Lawrences. Sean O Sullivan, current manager, featured at wingback. Four years later in 1986 Sarsfields won both minor and senior titles.
The Sash also won the All Ireland sevens in 1983 and 1984. In 1983, the team which included Kildare manager, John Crofton, Steve Kinneavy, John Courtney, Mick Walsh, Bernie Geraghty, Christy Sweeney, Des Bergin, Shay Fahy and Joe Murphy defeated Scotstown, Monaghan in the final on a score line of 1-21 to 2-15 in extra time. In the all Kildare final of 1984 the Sash accounted for Johnstown Bridge, winning on a score line of 4-15 to 2-8. Sean O Sullivan, manager of Sarsfields 2005 county championship winning team, played in that game.
The nineties saw the emergence of the phenomenally talented Niall Buckley and in 1993 with the experienced John Crofton, recently installed as county senior football manager, as captain, a young Sarfields team were champions again. To crown a fantastic year the minor and under twenty -one titles were also annexed. David Earley, Enda Freaney and John Whelan played in all three finals. The Dermot Burke Cup was retained in 1994 and the three in a row seemed a real possibility. Ballyteague, however, ended that dream in 1995.
In 1999 Sarsfields youth policy produced the goods again. With the emergence of such talents as Dermot Earley (junior) and Padraig Brennan (scorer of 10 points in the 1996 minor final),another championship was won despite the loss of Niall Buckley to suspension. The club reached its first Leinster final only to lose to Dublin’s Na Fianna.
Sarsfields twentieth title was captured in 2001 when neighbours, Moorefield were defeated. Na Fianna from Dublin defeated the Sash in the Leinster semi-final but used six substitutes, one more than allowed. The penalty was forfeiture of the game but Sarsfields offered to replay it. In a thrilling game, with Dermot Earley outstanding, Sarsfields were beaten in extra time with literally the last kick of the game.
2005 was another outstanding year for the Sash, winning the minor and senior championships. Sarsfields reached their second Leinster Final, narrowly losing out to Kilmacud Crokes. Gary White and Alan Smith, emulated the 1993 minor trio of Whelan, Earley and Freaney by playing on both teams. However, the minors were denied their opportunity of sharing the county final day with the seniors as Laurences, finalist in minor and senior finals were granted their request of postponing the minor game to allow their minors play with the senior team. To cap a great year the senior B team were also county championships beating Kilcock in a thrilling final .2006 was a poor year by Sarsfields present day standards when the seniors ended up in a championship relegation with Maynooth having failed to Qualify out of the groups stages of the championship for the first time since the group format was introduced. 2007 was a much better year when the Minor and U21 championships were captured. The seniors won the league beating Carbury after extra time. However the big prize eluded us after our archrivals Moorefield beat Sarsfields in the Senior final. The Junior C team won the championship to conclude a good year for the sash.
Recent years has seen a revival of hurling in the club. Three consecutive junior league finals were contested between 2007 and 2009 with two wins recorded. After a series of near misses, the Junior championship was annexed in 2009, allowing Sarsfields to compete in Intermediate ranks for the first time in over 20 years in 2010.
The senior footballers contested but lost out in the 2010 Co, final. However the senior B team won the championship for the 3rd year in a row at this level and also captured the Jack Higgins cup. In addition the junior C team captured the championship for the 2nd year in a row.
At underage level the U14 team captured the Feile title and went on to represent Kildare in the all Ireland series in Derry.
2012 was an all conquering year for the club on the football scene. The senior championship title was won against Carbury. In addition the senior team captured the league title and won the Aldridge cup. The senior B team lost out narrowly in the league final while the Reserve E team won the championship.
At underage level the U16 captured the A championship with a win over rivals Athy.
The U14 captured the league title with a win over Naas.
The Saturday morning underage academy was renamed The Dermot Earley Academy.
This academy continues to grow and strive under a very professional team of coaches and mentors and is a conveyor belt of players for our future teams

Hurling
After a number of years without a hurling team Sarsfields re-entered the junior league in 2007 and in June 2007 were crowned League champions after defeating Athy by 5–8 to 2–6. Sarsfields Hurling were 2009 Junior League and Championship double winners and now compete at Intermediate level.
Sarsfield GAA club now has a vibrant hurling academy open to children from Newbridge and surrounding areas. Training for U5's and U6's takes place every Saturday morning from March to October @ 10am, with U8's, U9's and U10's training taking place at 7pm on Friday evenings. Helmets and hurlies are provided for newcomers.

Ladies Football
Sarsfields were Kildare junior champions in 2003 and intermediate champions in 2004. They also won the Leinster Intermediate Championship in 2004 and the Ladies U14 league in 2007. They beat Moorefield in the minor Championship in 2008. They then went on to win their u15 County Championship in Division 1 in 2011. They again won the intermediate championship in 2014 and the first ever senior title in 2015.

Honours Sarsfields
 Kildare Senior Football Championship: Winners (25) 1904, 1905, 1906, 1907, 1908, 1909, 1910, 1912, 1915 1945, 1947, 1950, 1951, 1952, 1982, 1986, 1993, 1994, 1999, 2001, 2005, 2012, 2015, 2016, 2019
 Kildare Senior Football League Division 1: (14) 1945, 1946, 1947, 1952, 1954, 1981, 1983, 1984, 1986, 1988, 1989, 1992, 2007, 2012
 Kildare Senior Football League Division 2 (1) 2000
 Kildare Junior Football Championship: (2) 1924, 1933.
 Kildare U-21 Football Championship: (5) 1987, 1992, 1993, 2007, 2013, 2017
 Kildare Minor Football Championship (14) 1940, 1941, 1957, 1958, 1968, 1969, 1970, 1986, 1990, 1993, 1996, 2005, 2007, 2014
 Kildare Minor Football League DIV 1: (16) 1942, 1958, 1962, 1970, 1976, 1978, 1979, 1981, 1982, 1985, 1986, 1988, 1989, 1993, 2013, 2014
 Kildare Minor Football League DIV 4: (6) 1979, 1981, 1987, 1991, 1993, 1996
 Kildare Under-16 Football Championship (12) 1948, 1954, 1955- 62- 66-67-68- 88-2006, 2012, 2013, 2014 . FL: 1984– 88. 'B' 1999 2003
 Kildare Senior B Championship (9) 1994, 2005, 2008, 2009, 2010, 2015, 2017, 2019, 2020, 20221
 Jack Higgins Cup (4) 1985, 1994, 2009, 2015
 Kildare Junior Hurling Championship (1) 2009
 Kildare Intermediate B Hurling Championship''' (1) 2010

See also
 Davy Burke

References

Bibliography
 Sarsfields GFC 86 Golden Years 1897 To 1983 by Tommy O'Hanlon, Sarsfields GAA 1983, 108pp.
 Kildare GAA: A Centenary History, by Eoghan Corry, CLG Chill Dara, 1984,  hb  pb
 Kildare GAA yearbook, 1972, 1974, 1978, 1979, 1980 and 2000– in sequence especially the Millennium yearbook of 2000
 Soaring Sliothars: Centenary of Kildare Camogie 1904–2004 by Joan O'Flynn Kildare County Camogie Board.

External links
 GAA Club
 Kildare GAA site
 Kildare GAA club sites
 Kildare on Hoganstand.com

Newbridge, County Kildare
Gaelic games clubs in County Kildare
Gaelic football clubs in County Kildare